The 2011–12 New York Rangers season was the franchise's 85th season of play and their 86th season overall. The Rangers finished the regular season in first place in the Eastern Conference, winning the Atlantic Division title, the franchise's seventh division title, and their first since the 1993–94 championship season. The team's 51 wins and 109 points were also the most since their last championship. In the playoffs, the Rangers reached the Conference Finals for the first time since 1997, losing to the New Jersey Devils in six games.

Off-season
On April 11, 2011, the NHL announced that the Rangers would open the regular season in Stockholm, Sweden, on October 7, 2011, against the Los Angeles Kings, and on October 8 against the Anaheim Ducks as part of the 2011 NHL Premiere.

On May 13, Rangers forward Derek Boogaard was found dead in his apartment. Boogaard had played in 22 games for the Rangers during the 2010–11 season after signing a four-year deal with the Rangers in the previous off-season.

On June 29, Rangers captain Chris Drury's contract was bought out.

On July 2, free agent Brad Richards signed a nine-year contract worth almost $60 million with the Rangers. Richards had been considered to be the top free agent of 2011.

On August 4, Sean Avery was arrested at his home in Hollywood Hills for battery on a police officer after pushing an officer that was trying to break up a party at Avery's home.

On September 12, the Rangers announced that Ryan Callahan would be the 26th captain in New York Rangers history. Brad Richards and Marc Staal were named as alternate captains.

On September 26, the NHL officially announced that the Rangers would face the Philadelphia Flyers on January 2, 2012, in the 2012 NHL Winter Classic at Citizens Bank Park, the home of the Philadelphia Phillies. As part of the Winter Classic festivities, the Rangers were featured in HBO's 24/7 series. The throwback jerseys the Rangers wore for the Winter Classic were unveiled at an event on November 28.

Regular season
On December 10, the Rangers won their 2,500th game in franchise history at the Buffalo Sabres, 4–1.

On December 17, in a game against the Phoenix Coyotes in Phoenix, Brad Richards scored the game-winning goal with 0.1 seconds left in the third period to win the game for the Rangers 3–2, at the last possible moment in regulation.

On January 2, 2012, the Rangers beat the Philadelphia Flyers 3–2 in the 2012 NHL Winter Classic, moving into first place overall in the NHL for the first time at this point in the season since the 1995–96 season.

On January 6, thanks to the Rangers' first place standing in the Eastern Conference, Head Coach John Tortorella was named as one of the coaches for the 2012 NHL All-Star Game.

The Rangers set an NHL record by not allowing more than four goals in regulation in a game through the first 69 games of the season. The Rangers, with back-up goaltender Martin Biron playing, lost to the Pittsburgh Penguins on March 15 by a score of 5–2 to break the streak.

From March 11 to March 23, the Rangers had a seven-game homestand (playing every other day during that span), tying a franchise record for most consecutive games played at Madison Square Garden.  The other time this occurred was between December 10 and December 23 of the 2001–02 season.

The Rangers became the first Eastern Conference team to clinch a playoff spot with a 4–2 victory over the New Jersey Devils on March 20.

With a victory on March 24 against the Toronto Maple Leafs, the Rangers reached the 100-point plateau for the seventh time in franchise history, and the first time since the 2005–06 season.

On March 28, Henrik Lundqvist notched his 250th career win as the Broadway Blueshirts netminder, thus becoming the 45th goalie in NHL history to reach this plateau, in a 4–2 victory over the Winnipeg Jets at the MTS Centre.

With a 5–3 win at the Philadelphia Flyers on April 3, the Rangers clinched the Atlantic Division title and first place in the Eastern Conference with their 51st win in their 80th game of the season. The Rangers had been in first place in the Conference since December 30, 2011. It was the first title of either kind for the Rangers since winning the 1994 Stanley Cup.

Rookie Carl Hagelin was an early standout, coming in 6th on the team in both goals and total points, despite playing in only 64 games.

Post-season
On May 2, 2012, Marian Gaborik scored 14:41 into the third overtime of Game 3 of the Eastern Conference Semi-finals to defeat the Washington Capitals 2–1 at the Verizon Center. This was longest playoff game for the Rangers since April 29, 1971, when Pete Stemkowski scored in the third overtime for a 3–2 win in Game 6 of the 1971 Semi-finals over the Chicago Blackhawks at Madison Square Garden. Later in the series with Washington, on May 7, 2012, Brad Richards tied Game 5 with 6.6 seconds left in regulation, on a power-play. This was the latest tying goal in Rangers playoff history. That same Rangers power-play carried over into overtime due to it being a 4-minute double minor. Marc Staal then scored at 1:35 of overtime on the power-play, giving the Rangers a 3-2 victory, and a 3-2 series lead.

Standings

Divisional standings

Conference standings

Schedule and results

Pre-season

|-  style="text-align:center; background:white;"
| 1 || September 21 (in Albany, New York) || @ New Jersey Devils || 2 – 1 OT || Talbot || 0–0–1
|-  style="text-align:center; background:#cfc;"
| 2 || September 23 || @ New Jersey Devils || 4–3 || Johnson || 1–0–1
|-  style="text-align:center; background:#fcc;"
| 3 || September 26 || @ Philadelphia Flyers || 5–3 || Lundqvist || 1–1–1
|-  style="text-align:center; background:#cfc;"
| 4 || September 29 (in Prague, Czech Republic) || @ Sparta Praha || 2–0 || Biron || 2–1–1
|-  style="text-align:center; background:#cfc;"
| 5 || September 30 (in Gothenburg, Sweden) || @ Frolunda HC || 4–2 || Lundqvist || 3–1–1
|-  style="text-align:center; background:#cfc;"
| 6 || October 2 (in Bratislava, Slovakia) || @ Slovan Bratislava || 4–1 || Lundqvist || 4–1–1
|-  style="text-align:center; background:#fcc;"
| 7 || October 3 (in Zug, Switzerland) || @ EV Zug || 8–4 || Biron || 4–2–1
|-

Regular season

|-  style="text-align:center; background:white;"
| 1 || 7 (in Stockholm, Sweden) || @ Los Angeles Kings || 3 – 2 (OT) || Lundqvist || 0–0–1
|-  style="text-align:center; background:white;"
| 2 || 8 (in Stockholm, Sweden) || @ Anaheim Ducks || 2 – 1 (SO) || Lundqvist || 0–0–2
|-  style="text-align:center; background:#fcc;"
| 3 || 15 || @ New York Islanders || 4–2 || Lundqvist || 0–1–2
|-  style="text-align:center; background:#cfc;"
| 4 || 18 || @ Vancouver Canucks || 4–0 || Lundqvist || 1–1–2
|-  style="text-align:center; background:#cfc;"
| 5 || 20 || @ Calgary Flames || 3 – 2 (OT) || Lundqvist || 2–1–2
|-  style="text-align:center; background:#fcc;"
| 6 || 22 || @ Edmonton Oilers || 2–0 || Lundqvist || 2–2–2
|-  style="text-align:center; background:#cfc;"
| 7 || 24 || @ Winnipeg Jets || 2–1 || Biron || 3–2–2
|-  style="text-align:center; background:#fcc;"
| 8 || 27 || Toronto Maple Leafs || 4–2 || Lundqvist || 3–3–2
|-  style="text-align:center; background:white;"
| 9 || 29 || Ottawa Senators || 5 – 4 (SO) || Lundqvist || 3–3–3
|-  style="text-align:center; background:#cfc;"
| 10 || 31 || San Jose Sharks || 5–2 || Biron || 4–3–3
|-

|-  style="text-align:center; background:#cfc;"
| 11 || 3 || Anaheim Ducks || 2 – 1 (SO) || Lundqvist || 5–3–3
|-  style="text-align:center; background:#cfc;"
| 12 || 5 || Montreal Canadiens || 5–3 || Lundqvist || 6–3–3
|-  style="text-align:center; background:#cfc;"
| 13 || 6 || Winnipeg Jets || 3–0 || Biron || 7–3–3
|-  style="text-align:center; background:#cfc;"
| 14 || 9 || @ Ottawa Senators || 3–2 || Lundqvist || 8–3–3
|-  style="text-align:center; background:#cfc;"
| 15 || 11 || Carolina Hurricanes || 5–1 || Lundqvist || 9–3–3
|-  style="text-align:center; background:#cfc;"
| 16 || 15 || @ New York Islanders || 4–2 || Lundqvist || 10–3–3
|-  style="text-align:center; background:#fcc;"
| 17 || 19 || @ Montreal Canadiens || 4–0 || Biron || 10–4–3
|-  style="text-align:center; background:#fcc;"
| 18 || 23 || @ Florida Panthers || 2–1 || Lundqvist || 10–5–3
|-  style="text-align:center; background:#cfc;"
| 19 || 25 || @ Washington Capitals || 6–3 || Lundqvist || 11–5–3
|-  style="text-align:center; background:#cfc;"
| 20 || 26 || Philadelphia Flyers || 2–0 || Lundqvist || 12–5–3
|-  style="text-align:center; background:#cfc;"
| 21 || 29 || Pittsburgh Penguins || 4–3 || Lundqvist || 13–5–3
|-

|-  style="text-align:center; background:#cfc;"
| 22 || 1 || @ Carolina Hurricanes || 5–3 || Biron || 14–5–3
|-  style="text-align:center; background:#cfc;"
| 23 || 3 || @ Tampa Bay Lightning || 4–2 || Lundqvist || 15–5–3
|-  style="text-align:center; background:#fcc;"
| 24 || 5 || Toronto Maple Leafs || 4–2 || Lundqvist || 15–6–3
|-  style="text-align:center; background:white;"
| 25 || 8 || Tampa Bay Lightning || 3 – 2 (SO) || Lundqvist || 15–6–4
|-  style="text-align:center; background:#cfc;"
| 26 || 10 || @ Buffalo Sabres || 4–1 || Biron || 16–6–4
|-  style="text-align:center; background:#cfc;"
| 27 || 11 || Florida Panthers || 6–1 || Lundqvist || 17–6–4
|-  style="text-align:center; background:#fcc;"
| 28 || 13 || Dallas Stars || 1–0 || Lundqvist || 17–7–4
|-  style="text-align:center; background:#fcc;"
| 29 || 15 || @ St. Louis Blues || 4–1 || Lundqvist || 17–8–4
|-  style="text-align:center; background:#cfc;"
| 30 || 17 || @ Phoenix Coyotes || 3–2 || Biron || 18–8–4
|-  style="text-align:center; background:#cfc;"
| 31 || 20 || @ New Jersey Devils || 4–1 || Lundqvist || 19–8–4
|-  style="text-align:center; background:#cfc;"
| 32 || 22 || New York Islanders || 4–2 || Biron || 20–8–4
|-  style="text-align:center; background:#cfc;"
| 33 || 23 || Philadelphia Flyers || 4–2 || Lundqvist || 21–8–4
|-  style="text-align:center; background:#cfc;"
| 34 || 26 || New York Islanders || 3–0 || Lundqvist || 22–8–4
|-  style="text-align:center; background:#fcc;"
| 35 || 28 || @ Washington Capitals || 4–1 || Biron || 22–9–4
|-  style="text-align:center; background:#cfc;"
| 36 || 30 || @ Florida Panthers || 4–1 || Lundqvist || 23–9–4
|-

|-  style="text-align:center; background:#cfc;"
| 37 || 2 (2012 NHL Winter Classic) || @ Philadelphia Flyers || 3–2 || Lundqvist || 24–9–4
|-  style="text-align:center; background:#cfc;"
| 38 || 5 || Florida Panthers || 3 – 2 (OT) || Biron || 25–9–4
|-  style="text-align:center; background:#cfc;"
| 39 || 6 || @ Pittsburgh Penguins || 3–1 || Lundqvist || 26–9–4
|-  style="text-align:center; background:#cfc;"
| 40 || 10 || Phoenix Coyotes || 2 – 1 (SO) || Lundqvist || 27–9–4
|-  style="text-align:center; background:#fcc;"
| 41 || 12 || Ottawa Senators || 3–0 || Lundqvist || 27–10–4
|-  style="text-align:center; background:#cfc;"
| 42 || 14 || @ Toronto Maple Leafs || 3–0 || Biron || 28–10–4
|-  style="text-align:center; background:#fcc;"
| 43 || 15 || @ Montreal Canadiens || 4–1 || Lundqvist || 28–11–4
|-  style="text-align:center; background:#cfc;"
| 44 || 17 || Nashville Predators || 3–0 || Lundqvist || 29–11–4
|-  style="text-align:center; background:#fcc;"
| 45 || 19 || Pittsburgh Penguins || 4–1 || Lundqvist || 29–12–4
|-  style="text-align:center; background:#cfc;"
| 46 || 21 || @ Boston Bruins || 3 – 2 (OT) || Lundqvist || 30–12–4
|-  style="text-align:center; background:#cfc;"
| 47 || 24 || Winnipeg Jets || 3–0 || Lundqvist || 31–12–4
|-  style="text-align:center; background:white;"
| 48 || 31 || @ New Jersey Devils || 4 – 3 (SO) || Biron || 31–12–5
|-

|-  style="text-align:center; background:#cfc;"
| 49 || 1 || @ Buffalo Sabres || 1 – 0 (SO) || Lundqvist || 32–12–5
|-  style="text-align:center; background:#cfc;"
| 50 || 5 || Philadelphia Flyers || 5–2 || Lundqvist || 33–12–5
|-  style="text-align:center; background:#fcc;"
| 51 || 7 || New Jersey Devils || 1–0 || Lundqvist || 33–13–5
|-  style="text-align:center; background:#cfc;"
| 52 || 9 || Tampa Bay Lightning || 4 – 3 (OT) || Biron || 34–13–5
|-  style="text-align:center; background:#cfc;"
| 53 || 11 || @ Philadelphia Flyers || 5–2 || Lundqvist || 35–13–5
|-  style="text-align:center; background:#cfc;"
| 54 || 12 || Washington Capitals || 3–2 || Lundqvist || 36–13–5
|-  style="text-align:center; background:#cfc;"
| 55 || 14 || @ Boston Bruins || 3–0 || Lundqvist || 37–13–5
|-  style="text-align:center; background:#fcc;"
| 56 || 16 || Chicago Blackhawks || 4–2 || Biron || 37–14–5
|-  style="text-align:center; background:#cfc;"
| 57 || 19 || Columbus Blue Jackets || 3 – 2 (OT) || Lundqvist || 38–14–5
|-  style="text-align:center; background:#fcc;"
| 58 || 21 || @ Pittsburgh Penguins || 2–0 || Lundqvist || 38–15–5
|-  style="text-align:center; background:white;"
| 59 || 24 || @ New York Islanders || 4 – 3 (SO) || Biron || 38–15–6
|-  style="text-align:center; background:#cfc;"
| 60 || 25 || Buffalo Sabres || 3 – 2 (OT) || Lundqvist || 39–15–6
|-  style="text-align:center; background:#cfc;"
| 61 || 27 || New Jersey Devils || 2–0 || Lundqvist || 40–15–6
|-

|-  style="text-align:center; background:#cfc;"
| 62 || 1 || @ Carolina Hurricanes || 3–2 || Biron || 41–15–6
|-  style="text-align:center; background:white;"
| 63 || 2 || @ Tampa Bay Lightning || 4 – 3 (OT) || Lundqvist || 41–15–7
|-  style="text-align:center; background:#cfc;"
| 64 || 4 || Boston Bruins || 4–3 || Lundqvist || 42–15–7
|-  style="text-align:center; background:#fcc;"
| 65 || 6 || @ New Jersey Devils || 4–1 || Lundqvist || 42–16–7
|-  style="text-align:center; background:#fcc;"
| 66 || 8 || @ Ottawa Senators || 4–1 || Biron || 42–17–7
|-  style="text-align:center; background:#fcc;"
| 67 || 9 || @ Chicago Blackhawks || 4–3 || Lundqvist || 42–18–7
|-  style="text-align:center; background:#cfc;"
| 68 || 11 || New York Islanders || 4 – 3 (OT) || Lundqvist || 43–18–7
|-  style="text-align:center; background:#cfc;"
| 69 || 13 || Carolina Hurricanes || 4–2 || Biron || 44–18–7
|-  style="text-align:center; background:#fcc;"
| 70 || 15 || Pittsburgh Penguins || 5–2 || Biron || 44–19–7
|-  style="text-align:center; background:#fcc;"
| 71 || 17 || Colorado Avalanche || 3–1 || Lundqvist || 44–20–7
|-  style="text-align:center; background:#cfc;"
| 72 || 19 || New Jersey Devils || 4–2 || Lundqvist || 45–20–7
|-  style="text-align:center; background:#cfc;"
| 73 || 21 || Detroit Red Wings || 2 – 1 (OT) || Lundqvist || 46–20–7
|-  style="text-align:center; background:#fcc;"
| 74 || 23 || Buffalo Sabres || 4 – 1 || Lundqvist || 46–21–7
|-  style="text-align:center; background:#cfc;"
| 75 || 24 || @ Toronto Maple Leafs || 4 – 3 (SO) || Lundqvist || 47-21-7
|-  style="text-align:center; background:#cfc;"
| 76 || 27 || @ Minnesota Wild || 3 – 2 || Lundqvist || 48-21-7
|-  style="text-align:center; background:#cfc;"
| 77 || 28 || @ Winnipeg Jets || 4 – 2 || Lundqvist || 49-21-7
|-  style="text-align:center; background:#cfc;"
| 78 || 30 || Montreal Canadiens || 4 – 1 || Lundqvist || 50-21-7
|-

|-  style="text-align:center; background:#fcc;"
| 79 || 1 || Boston Bruins || 2 – 1 || Lundqvist || 50-22-7
|-  style="text-align:center; background:#cfc;"
| 80 || 3 || @ Philadelphia Flyers || 5 – 3 || Lundqvist || 51-22-7
|-  style="text-align:center; background:#fcc;"
| 81 || 5 || @ Pittsburgh Penguins || 5 – 2 || Biron || 51-23-7
|-  style="text-align:center; background:#fcc;"
| 82 || 7 || Washington Capitals || 4 – 1 || Lundqvist || 51-24-7
|-

Detailed records

Playoffs

The New York Rangers ended the 2011–12 regular season as the Eastern Conference's first seed. They faced the #8 seed Ottawa Senators in the first round. The Rangers battled back from a 3-2 series deficit to defeat the Senators in seven games. The Rangers defeated the #7 seed Washington Capitals their second round opponent, in seven games. In the Eastern Conference Finals, the Rangers faced the #6 seed New Jersey Devils.  After leading the series 2-1, the Rangers lost 3 games in a row and lost the series 4-2.

Key:  Win  Loss

Player statistics
Skaters

Goaltenders

†Denotes player spent time with another team before joining Rangers. Stats reflect time with Rangers only.
‡Traded mid-season. Stats reflect time with Rangers only.

Awards and records

Awards

Nominations

Records

Milestones

Transactions
The Rangers have been involved in the following transactions during the 2011–12 season:

Trades

|}

Free agents signed

Free agents lost

Claimed via waivers

Lost via waivers

Lost via buyout

Player signings

Draft picks
New York's picks at the 2011 NHL Entry Draft in St. Paul, Minnesota.

See also 
 2011–12 NHL season

Farm teams

Connecticut Whale (AHL)
The 2011–12 season was the 15th season of AHL hockey for the franchise, and was the franchise's first full season as the Connecticut Whale.

Greenville Road Warriors (ECHL)
The 2011–12 season was the 2nd season of affiliation for the Rangers and the Greenville Road Warriors.

References

New York Rangers seasons
New York Rangers
New York Rangers
New York Rangers
New York Rangers
 in Manhattan
Madison Square Garden